Huangdi may refer to:

Yellow Emperor (黃帝), a legendary Chinese monarch who supposedly ruled before the Xia dynasty
Emperor of China (皇帝), the imperial title of Chinese monarchs; and the superlative monarchical title in the Sinosphere

Places
Huangdi, Henan, a town in Huojia County, Henan, China
Huangdi, Liaoning, a town in Suizhong County, Liaoning, China
Huangdi, Xinjiang, a town in Yarkant County, Xinjiang, China
Huangdi Township, a township in Longhua County, Hebei, China